Disinvestment from Iran is a campaign primarily in the United States that aims to encourage disinvestment from the state of Iran.

Legislation

Federal
The Iran Sanctions Enabling Act (H.R. 1327) was introduced in US Congress by Reps. Barney Frank (D-MA) and Mark Kirk (R-IL).  It passed 414–6.  The legislation aims to protects fund managers who divest from such companies from potential lawsuits, thereby facilitating state efforts to divest from the Islamist regime.

Support
The Israeli newspaper Haaretz describes the origin of the efforts in 2007:

Various Israeli sources and the pro-Israel lobby, the American Israel Public Affairs Committee (AIPAC), are also contributing to the efforts, particularly through specific legislation in various American states where pension funds hold stock in firms invested in Iran.

According to the Jewish Telegraphic Agency, the AIPAC has made the campaign for disinvestment from Iran a major policy goal for 2009.  The JTA wrote that the H.R. 1327 disinvestment bill is "strongly backed by AIPAC" and its introduction to Congress during the yearly AIPAC conference was "no coincidence" because "having 6,000 conference-goers press for their passage next Tuesday [during the AIPAC conference] is bound to give them a turbo boost."

See also
 Disinvestment from South Africa
 Disinvestment from Israel

References

Disinvestment
International sanctions
Iran–United States relations
Boycotts of countries
Sanctions against Iran